Dionisio Muñoz (born 29 March 1961) is a Spanish weightlifter. He competed at the 1984 Summer Olympics and the 1988 Summer Olympics.

References

1961 births
Living people
Spanish male weightlifters
Olympic weightlifters of Spain
Weightlifters at the 1984 Summer Olympics
Weightlifters at the 1988 Summer Olympics
Sportspeople from Pamplona
20th-century Spanish people